Scorpaenopsis rubrimarginata is a species of venomous marine ray-finned fish belonging to the family Scorpaenidae, the scorpionfishes. This species is found in the Western Indian Ocean.

Size

References

rubrimarginata
Taxa named by Ronald Fricke
Fish described in 2013